Kate Carroll (born 1974) is an American professor of chemistry, chemical biology, and biochemistry at Scripps Research in Jupiter, FL, since 2010. She was previously a tenure-track assistant professor at the University of Michigan.

Education 
Carroll received a BA in Chemistry from Mills College in 1996 and her PhD in Chemistry from Stanford University in 2003, studying with Suzanne Pfeffer. Her graduate research involved studying protein regulation of genes such as Rab9. She completed postdoctoral studies with Carolyn R. Bertozzi in 2006.

Research 
Carroll has developed protein cysteine oxidation as a new paradigm for the regulation of cell signaling pathways. Her group has also examined sulfa- and thioreductase activity in Mycobacterium as potential drug targets to treat diseases like tuberculosis. Carroll incorporates tools such as proteomic labeling and chemical probes to decipher how oxidation of target cysteines in proteins by reactive oxygen species (ROS) leads to downstream changes in cell cycle regulation.

Volunteer service 
Carroll served as the Vice-Chair for the 2018 Gordon Research Conference in Thiol-Based Redox Regulation and Signaling. She will serve as the Chair in 2020.

She serves as an Editorial board member to scientific journals including Journal of Biological Chemistry, Molecular Biosystems, and Cell Chemical Biology.

Awards 

 2013 – Pfizer Award in Enzyme Chemistry. 
 2010 – Camille Dreyfus Teacher-Scholar Award
 2008 – Scientist Development Award, American Heart Association

References

External links
 Scripps faculty page

Living people
21st-century American chemists
Stanford University alumni
Mills College alumni
1974 births
American women chemists
21st-century American women scientists